The 1994 NCAA Women's Gymnastics championship involved 12 schools competing for the national championship of women's NCAA Division I gymnastics.  It was the thirteenth NCAA gymnastics national championship and the defending NCAA Team Champion for 1993 was Georgia.  The Competition took place in Salt Lake City, Utah, hosted by the University of Utah in the Jon M. Huntsman Center. The 1994 Championship was won by the hosts, the Utah Red Rocks.

Team Results

Session 1

Session 2

Super Six

External links
  Gym Results

NCAA Women's Gymnastics championship
NCAA Women's Gymnastics Championship